This is a list of symphonies in B-flat major written by notable composers.

See also

For symphonies in other keys, see List of symphonies by key.

Notes

References

Bryan, Paul, Johann Waṅhall, Viennese Symphonist: His Life and His Musical Environment Stuyvesant: Pendragon Press (1997)
Hill, George R.: "Thematic Index" in The Symphony 1720–1840 Series B - Volume X, ed. Barry S. Brooks (New York & London, 1981) 

B flat major
Symphonies